The Outhouse was a hardcore punk music venue located east of Lawrence, Kansas, United States, on 15th Street. Original shows listed the venue as Past the Pavement Hall, being as the county pavement ended about 3/4 of a mile from the building.

History
The parcel The Outhouse sits on used to house a one-room country school. Two large heritage trees still mark the entrance to the school site. The venue hosted many live music acts between the time it was leased for fraternity parties and biker bashes in 1985, until it was discovered by young rock bands desperate for a place to perform. 

The first hardcore/alternative rock shows at The Outhouse happened in the late summer/fall of 1985. The growing mainstream popularity of pop punk music in the early 1990s led to the decline of the Outhouse, but what ultimately caused its closing was the Great Flood of 1993. Its doors were permanently closed in 1998. The building once known as the Outhouse is now a BYOB strip club with a small outhouse out near the road.

The Outhouse was unique because it was a gutted cinder-block storage garage in the middle of a corn field. The walls (if any) had been torn out leaving only cinder-block walls. Original shows in 1985 featured no stage until a stage was built by volunteers from the University of Kansas student radio station, KJHK, and various local bands. KJHK and others had made an arrangement with the Flaming Lips to play there and felt a stage was needed to attract other non-local acts. During the construction of the stage, it was suggested that the name be changed from Past the Pavement Hall. One KJHK staffer remarked that the place was a "shithole" and it should be called The Outhouse. The name stuck. Unfortunately, the Flaming Lips tour van broke down and that seminal show never occurred.

In the April 1986 issue of Spin, KJHK was recognized for "excellence in supporting a local music scene" for their work in bringing many national acts to The Outhouse and other Lawrence, Kansas music venues. It was a vibrant time for alternative live music in the Midwest.

The stage was a box that stood approximately a foot and a half above the cement floor. Much later, a bar area was added to the back that was used to sell T-shirts, and other band merchandise, as well as non-alcoholic refreshments. People often brought their own alcohol. At first alcohol was allowed in the club, but after The Outhouse received publicity in the local press, the Kansas ABC told the owner that it would begin enforcing the law at The Outhouse. Thereafter, alcohol was openly consumed in the parking-lot/front-yard, but not inside.

People would park in the front yard, and for large concerts, they would often park on the nearby gravel road. The field across the street was rumored to have housed a missile silo, but this was incorrect.

The building stood just outside the jurisdiction of the Lawrence police department. The Outhouse rarely had any sort of security, but negative incidents were rare. No one stood between the audience and the band.

Prior to the Outhouse, venues such as Veterans of Foreign Wars Halls in Kansas City and the Lawrence Opera House (later called Liberty Hall) would host hardcore concerts. When several of the local venues closed, the Outhouse quickly became the place to see punk shows. Concerts at the Outhouse were very inexpensive, with the first shows costing $3, and with $8 being the high end in the early 1990s.

Shows at the Outhouse weren't limited to the typical hardcore genre; there were ska, alternative, thrash metal, Oi! and other types of underground genres. People would come from as far as Topeka, Kansas, Kansas City and sometimes further, and with the University of Kansas nearby, there was no shortage of patrons.

Notable performers

 
 24-7 Spyz
 7 Seconds
 Adolescents
 Adrenalin O.D.
 Agent Orange
 Agnostic Front
 Alice Donut
 ALL
 Anti-Flag
 ANTiSEEN
 Bad Brains
 Big Drill Car
 The Beatnigs
 Body Count
 Blue Meanies
 The Business
 Circle Jerks
 Cro Mags
 D.I.
 Dag Nasty
 Descendents
 Die Kreuzen
 Doughboys
 Dropkick Murphys
 D.O.A.
 D.R.I.
 Fear
 Fire Party
 Firehose
 Fishbone
 Flaming Lips
 Fugazi
 F.Y.P
 Gaye Bykers on Acid
 Government Issue
 Get Smart!
 Green Day
 The Georgia Satellites
 GWAR
 Helmet
 Homestead Grays
 Jawbox
 The Jesus Lizard
 L7
 Legal Weapon
 MDC
 Meat Puppets
 The Melvins
 The Micronotz
 The Mighty Mighty Bosstones
 Mind Over Four
 MU330
 Naked Raygun
 Nashville Pussy
 Nirvana
 No Means No
 The Offspring
 Pagan Babies
 Pantera
 Parasites
 Paw
 Prong
 The Queers
 Quicksand
 Rank and File
 Rapeman
 Redd Kross
 Rollins Band
 Rhythm Pigs
 Salem 66
 The Selecter
 Sick of It All
 Slapshot
 Sloppy Seconds
 Social Distortion
 Sonic Youth
 Soulside
 Swamp Thing
 Tool
 Toxic Reasons
 Tupelo Chain Sex
 Ultraman
 U.K. Subs
 The Urge
 The Vandals
 Victims Family
 White Flag
 White Zombie

Flyers
The Outhouse promoters had few options to advertise concerts. The University of Kansas's KJHK radio was instrumental in promoting Outhouse shows. In Kansas City, the local public radio station, 90.1 KKFI, had a two-hour hardcore/alternative show called The Little Orphan Annie Show (which went through several hosts and names), that would often announce concerts. The concerts were also sometimes announced in the local alternative newspaper The Pitch. The most common promotion technique was plastering flyers in Lawrence and in areas like the Westport neighborhood of the Kansas City Metropolitan area.

References

External links
 
 
 
 
 
 

Music venues completed in 1984
Music venues in Kansas
Former music venues in the United States
Lawrence, Kansas
1984 establishments in Kansas